The Jibou Botanical Garden, now named after its founder, Vasile Fati (1932-2007), is a botanical garden located in Jibou, Romania.

The Botanical Garden is situated in the north-east side of Jibou, on the second bank of Someș River.

History 
The works for the organization of the Botanical Garden from Jibou started between the years 1959-1968, when Vasile Fati (1932-2007), a biology teacher, with the students and with the other teachers manages to prove that the parks around Wesselényi Castle, where the high school was functioning is appropriate for a botanical garden.

Between the years 1968-1970 the first greenhouse of 110 square meters was built. Between the years 1978-1982, the two greenhouses were built, the aquarium and the volar. The Botanical Garden “Vasile Fati” in incorporated in the Botanical Gardens' Association from Romania (B.G.A.R) with the other botanical gardens.

Gallery

References

External links
 Botanical Garden "Vasile Fati" Jibou
 Gradina Botanica din Jibou 
 Grădina Botanică din Jibou
 Primaria Jibou - grădina 
Primele sere ale Grădinii Botanice din Jibou

Jibou
Botanical gardens in Romania
Jibou
Tourist attractions in Sălaj County
Buildings and structures completed in 1968